Paweł Pawłowski (born 3 March 1982) is a Polish basketball player for Decka Pelplin and the Polish 3x3 national team.

He represented Poland at the 2020 Summer Olympics.

References

1982 births
Living people
3x3 basketball players at the 2020 Summer Olympics
Forwards (basketball)
Olympic 3x3 basketball players of Poland
Polish men's basketball players
Polish men's 3x3 basketball players